Royale Airlines was a regional airline with headquarters on the grounds of Shreveport Regional Airport (SHV) in Shreveport, Louisiana.

Operations
Royale operated scheduled passenger flights in Louisiana, Texas, Mississippi, Tennessee and Florida from 1962 to 1989. It primarily operated turboprop aircraft such as the Embraer EMB-110 Bandeirante, Beechcraft Model 99, Short 330 and Grumman Gulfstream G-I with the latter being a regional airliner version of Grumman's successful propjet business aircraft. Royale also flew two Douglas DC-9-14 jetliners on services from Houston Intercontinental Airport (IAH) primarily to Brownsville, Texas (BRO) on behalf of Continental Airlines. For a short period between 1985 and 1986 Royale operated de Havilland Canada DHC-6 Twin Otter aircraft acquired from Metro Airlines which had moved its operations to the Dallas-Fort Worth Metroplex in Texas and also to Atlanta, Georgia.   These Twin Otter STOL (Short Take Off and Landing) turboprop aircraft were primarily utilized to shuttle passengers between the Clear Lake City STOLport, which was located near the NASA Johnson Space Center, and Houston Intercontinental Airport (now George Bush Intercontinental Airport).

Royale also operated as a Continental Express air carrier via a code sharing agreement with Continental Airlines and provided passenger feed at Continental's Houston hub (IAH) during the final years of operation prior to its bankruptcy Chapter 11 filing on September 9, 1987.

Destinations
Royale Airlines served the following destinations at various times during its existence:

 Alexandria, Louisiana
 Austin, Texas
 Baton Rouge, Louisiana
 Beaumont/Port Arthur, Texas
 Brownsville, Texas
 Clear Lake City, Texas
 College Station, Texas
 Dallas, Texas (Love Field)
 Greenwood, Mississippi
 Fort Polk, Louisiana
 Houma, Louisiana 
 Houston, Texas (Intercontinental Airport) - Hub
 Jackson, Mississippi
 Lafayette, Louisiana
 Lake Charles, Louisiana
 Lake Jackson, Texas
 Laredo, Texas
 Laurel/Hattiesburg, Mississippi
 Memphis, Tennessee
 Morgan City/Patterson, Louisiana
 Monroe, Louisiana
 Natchez, Mississippi
 New Orleans, Louisiana - Hub
 Oxford/University, Mississippi
 Pensacola, Florida
 San Antonio, Texas
 Shreveport, Louisiana - Home base
 Victoria, Texas

Fleet 

 Beechcraft 99
 de Havilland Canada DHC-6 Twin Otter 
 Douglas DC-9-10 - only jet aircraft type operated by Royale
 Embraer EMB-110 Bandeirante
 Grumman Gulfstream I (model G-159)
 Short 330

Cessation of Operations 

The airline encountered financial difficulties and then ceased operations during the late 1980s when its Chapter 11 bankruptcy filing of 1987 was changed to Chapter 7 bankruptcy in February 1989.

See also 
 List of defunct airlines of the United States

References

External links 

 
 

Defunct airlines of the United States
Companies that have filed for Chapter 7 bankruptcy
Companies that filed for Chapter 11 bankruptcy in 1987
Companies based in Shreveport, Louisiana
History of Shreveport, Louisiana